Atzgersdorf (Central Bavarian: Atzgasduaf) is a former municipality in Lower Austria that is now a part of the 23rd Viennese district Liesing. A small part of the former municipality today is part of the 12th Viennese district Meidling.

Today, the cadastral commune Atzgersdorf has got an area of 411,42 hectare. The part that belongs to Meidling has got an area of 35 hectare.

Geography 
The east of Atzgersdorf is counted among the geological era of Holocene. The west is built on ground originating in the Pannonium, which is a subdivision of the Miocene.

People 

 Ludwig von Bertalanffy (1901–1972), biologist
 Hanns Hörbiger (1860–1931), engineer
 Kurt Peters (1897–1978), chemist
 Josef von Romako (1828-1882), naval officer
 Anton Romako (1832–1889), painter
 Karl Skraup (1898–1958), actor
 Leopold Vogl (born 1910), football player
 Karl Ecker (1947-1970), football player

Further reading 
 David Sylvester Mayer von Rosenau: Geschichte Atzgersdorf's. Wien 1898
 Ferdinand Opll: Liesing: Geschichte des 23. Wiener Gemeindebezirks und seiner alten Orte. Jugend und Volk, Wien 1982,

References

External links 

 Atzgersdorf online 
 wien.at | Atzgersdorf
 Bezirksmuseum Liesing | History of Atzgersdorf

Liesing
Meidling